The Hubert Murray Stadium is a sports venue located in Port Moresby, the capital city of Papua New Guinea. It was developed for the  1969 South Pacific Games on reclaimed land at Konedobu that had previously been shoreline mangroves. The athletics events and the opening and closing ceremonies were held at the new stadium, which was named after Sir Hubert Murray, a former lieutenant governor.

With an initial capacity of approximately 15,000 spectators, it was used for soccer and school athletic events after the 1969 games. In late 2003, a three-stage redevelopment of the site at a cost of K120 million via a public-private partnership began to expand the capacity to seat 25,000 people. The redeveloped stadium will be used for rugby league, rugby union, and soccer in a venue fit for FIFA standards, naturally grassed and with lighting suitable for television broadcasting of night events.

The plans for the six-storey main stand include eight restaurants and a gymnasium with the facilities to host the weightlifting competition for the 2015 Pacific Games. Australian football and cricket are to be catered for by further expansion in stage three of the redevelopment.

References

Sports venues in Papua New Guinea
Football venues in Papua New Guinea
Athletics (track and field) venues in Papua New Guinea
Buildings and structures in Port Moresby
Rugby league stadiums in Papua New Guinea
1969 establishments in Papua New Guinea
Sports venues completed in 1969